Mönkh-Erdeniin Tögöldör is a Mongolian footballer who currently plays for SP Falcons in Ulanbaatar as a midfielder. With 7 goals he is currently Mongolia's third top scorer of all-time.

Career

Club
Tögöldör started playing football at age 10 with various local and provincial teams. He joined Erchim FC of the Mongolian Premier League in 2010.

In late 2014, Tögöldör and fellow Mongolian Khürelbaataryn Tsend-Ayuush played for Yingcharoen F.C. of the Thailand Amateur League, the fifth level of football in the country, in the off-season in hopes of being spotted and signed by a professional club. Neither player was ultimately signed and Tögöldör returned to Erchim FC.

In early January 2018 it was reported that Tögöldör and two other Mongolian players were being eyed by the Uzbekistan Football Federation in hopes of signing them to Uzbek League clubs.

Prior to the 2020 season, Tögöldör signed for SP Falcons, also of the Mongolian Premier League, along with Tsend-Ayuush Khürelbaatar and Tserendovdon Tumur-Ochir. He scored his first goal for the club in the opening match of the season, the eventual game-winner in the 1–0 victory over Deren FC. The goal was also the overall first goal scored by any team in 2020.

International
Tögöldör played his first international game with the senior national team on 6 March 2013 in and against Sri Lanka (3–0), after he came on as a substitute for Amgalangiin Chinzorig in the 60th minute of that game.

International goals
Scores and results list Mongolia's goal tally first.

Honours
Erchim
 Mongolia Premier League (4): 2012, 2013, 2015, 2016
 Mongolia Cup (1):  2012

References

External links
 

Living people
Mongolian footballers
Mongolia international footballers
Erchim players
Association football midfielders
1991 births
Mongolian National Premier League players